The Zhang Family's Daughter-in-Law is a 1985 Chinese drama film directed by Ye Ming, based on Wang Anyi's award-winning 1982 novella Lapse of Time.

Cast and characters
For whatever reason, the heroine's name was changed from Ouyang Duanli in the novel to Ouyang Ruili.
Li Lan as Ouyang Ruili
Wang Weiping as Zhang Wenyao
Sun Jian as Zhang Wenguang
Lü Liping as Zhang Wenying
Meng Qian as Ouyang's mother-in-law
Bai Mu as Ouyang's father-in-law
Zeng Hui as Duoduo
Zhang Qi as Duoduo (older)
Lu Yi as Lailai
Yang Yidi as Lailai (adult)
Wei Ding as Mimi
Shao Lingli as Mimi (adult)
He Jiehao as Qingqing
Liu Guiqin
Tang Guoguang
Li Jianfei
Chen Weiguo
Ye Meng
Yang Huichun

References

External links
 Film stills
The Zhang Family's Daughter-in-Law at Complete Index to World Film

1985 films
Chinese drama films
Films set in Shanghai
Films based on Chinese novels
Films about the Cultural Revolution
Shanghai Film Studio films
1980s Mandarin-language films
Films based on works by Wang Anyi